The 2015 UTSA Roadrunners football team represented the University of Texas at San Antonio in the 2015 NCAA Division I FBS football season. That was the fifth season for football at UTSA and their third as members of Conference USA in the West Division. Larry Coker returned as the team's head coach for a fifth season. The Roadrunners played their home games at the Alamodome. They finished the season 3–9, 3–5 in C-USA play to finish in a three way tie for third place in the West Division.

On January 5, head coach Larry Coker resigned. In five seasons as UTSA's first head coach, Coker had a record of 26–31.

After the season, tight end David Morgan II became the first NFL Draft pick from UTSA when he was selected by the Minnesota Vikings in the 6th round.

Schedule
UTSA announced their 2015 football schedule on February 2, 2015. The 2015 schedule consist of 6 home and away games in the regular season. The Roadrunners will host C-USA opponents Louisiana Tech, Middle Tennessee, Old Dominion, and Rice, and will travel to Charlotte, North Texas, Southern Miss, and UTEP.

Schedule Source:

Game summaries

at #22 Arizona

Kansas State

at Oklahoma State

Colorado State

at UTEP

Louisiana Tech

at Southern Miss

at North Texas

Old Dominion

at Charlotte

Rice

at Middle Tennessee

References

UTSA
UTSA Roadrunners football seasons
UTSA Roadrunners football